Firozabad is the name of several cities and towns.

Pakistan
 Firozabad in Karachi, Sindh

India
 Firozabad district, Uttar Pradesh

 Firozabad, a city in Firozabad District
 Firozabad, historical city established by Firuz Shah Tughlaq, Sultan of Delhi, in Delhi ca 1350s, now in ruins, see Feroz Shah Kotla

 Firozabad (Lok Sabha constituency)